Laguna Brava Formation, formerly referred to as Santo Domingo Formation, is a Late Eocene (Tinguirirican in the SALMA classification) sedimentary formation located in the Argentine Northwest. The formation contains beds with fossil bird tracks described as Gruipeda dominguensis.

It was formerly thought that the formation was of Triassic age.

References 

Geologic formations of Argentina
Eocene Series of South America
Paleogene Argentina
Tinguirirican
Priabonian Stage
Sandstone formations
Tuff formations
Fluvial deposits
Lacustrine deposits
Ichnofossiliferous formations
Fossiliferous stratigraphic units of South America
Paleontology in Argentina
Geology of Mendoza Province